The Evil Within is a 2014 video game.

The Evil Within may also refer to:
 The Evil Within (1970 film)
 The Evil Within (2017 film)
 The Evil Within, a 2006 episode from Blade: The Series
 The Evil Within, the U.S. title for the 1990 film Baby Blood

See also
The Devil Within (disambiguation)